The 1985 Indian Federation Cup Final was the 9th final of the Indian Federation Cup, the top knock-out competition in India, and was contested between Kolkata giants East Bengal and Mohun Bagan on 19 May 1985 at the Sampangi Stadium in Bangalore, Karnataka.

East Bengal won the final 1–0 courtesy of a goal by Jamshid Nassiri in the extra-time to claim their third Federation Cup title.

Route to the final

Match

Summary
The Federation Cup final began at the Sampangi Stadium in Bangalore on 19 May 1985 in front of a packed crowd as two Kolkata giants East Bengal and Mohun Bagan faced each other in the Kolkata Derby. The match was also a classic rivalry between the two coaches P. K. Banerjee of East Bengal and Amal Dutta of Mohun Bagan, two of the most famous coaches from Bengal at the time. East Bengal started as the favorites with a strong defense consisting of Balai Mukherjee, Monoranjan Bhattacharya, Tarun Dey and Aloke Mukherjee and a star-studded forward line comprising of Krishanu Dey, Biswajit Bhattacharya, Bikash Panji and Jamshid Nassiri. Both teams however canceled each other in the regulation ninety minutes but East Bengal won the match in extra-time after Iranian forward Jamshid Nassiri scored with a 30-yard long-range effort as East Bengal defeated their arch-rival Mohun Bagan 1–0 and lifted their third Federation Cup title.

Details

See also
 India - List of Federation Cup Winners

References

East Bengal Club matches
Mohun Bagan AC matches
Indian Federation Cup Finals